"Postcard from Heaven" is a song by the Lighthouse Family, released as the duo's fifth and final single from their second album Postcards from Heaven (1999). The song was produced by Mike Peden. It was released in February 1999 and reached the top 30 in the UK as well as being just outside the top 90 in Europe. It received a completely different remixed version for single release. This mix appeared on both the Greatest Hits and Relaxed & Remixed compilations, in 2002 and 2004 respectively.

Tracklisting
 UK CD
 "Postcard from Heaven" (7" Mix) — 4:22
 "Ocean Drive" (Demo) — 3:54
 "Let It All Change" (Demo) — 4:47
 
 European CD / UK Cassette
 "Postcard from Heaven" (7" Mix) — 4:22
 "Once in a Blue Moon" (Demo) — 4:14

Charts

Chart performance
"Postcard from Heaven" reached #24 in the UK Singles Chart and stayed in the charts for 6 weeks. It also reached #91 in the Eurochart Hot 100 but it only stayed in the charts for 1 week.

External links
Official Charts Company - UK chart performance of Lighthouse Family's "Postcard From Heaven"
Eurochart Hot 100 which shows the peak position of Lighthouse Family's "Postcard From Heaven"

1999 singles
Lighthouse Family songs
Songs written by Paul Tucker (musician)
1997 songs
Polydor Records singles